Saâdi Radouani (born 18 March 1995) is an Algerian footballer who plays for USM Alger in the Algerian Ligue Professionnelle 1. He plays primarily as a right-back.

Career
In the summer of 2016, Radouani signed a two-year contract with JS Kabylie.

In 2018, Saâdi Radouani signed a two-year contract with ES Sétif.

In 2020, Radouani signed a two-year contract with USM Alger.

Honours

Club
 USM Alger
 Algerian Ligue Professionnelle 1 (1): 2015-16

External links

References

1995 births
Algerian footballers
Algerian Ligue Professionnelle 1 players
ES Sétif players
JS Kabylie players
Living people
Footballers from Sétif
USM Alger players
USM Sétif players
Association football defenders
21st-century Algerian people
Algeria A' international footballers
2022 African Nations Championship players